Hereford is an unincorporated community in Baker County, in the U.S. state of Oregon. Hereford lies along the Burnt River southwest of Baker. It is on Oregon Route 245 northeast of its intersection with U.S. Route 26 in Unity.

Hereford once had a post office, but the area continues to use a ZIP code 97837. It is said that the community was named in the late 19th century for a Hereford bull. A post office was established here on March 7, 1887.

References

External links
Photos of Hereford by Richard Bauer

Unincorporated communities in Baker County, Oregon
Unincorporated communities in Oregon